George of Drama (January 1, 1901 – November 4, 1959) was a Greek elder known for his gifts of spiritual discernment and clairvoyance. He is considered by Eastern Orthodox as a confessor and venerable.

George Karslidis was born in 1901 in Chadik, Tsalka, Georgia. His grandparents were refugees who had come from Gümüşhane, Ottoman Empire, following the Crimean War.  At a young age, he was orphaned, losing both his father and his mother on the same day. Wounded by the abusive treatment given to him by his older brother, he escaped, alone, to the mountains, where he was saved by Turkish villagers, who took him with them back to Pontos. He is known to have been in Georgia, Armenia, and Russia before spending most of his life in the village of Taxiarches (Sipsa), in Drama, Northern Greece. He founded the Monastery of the Ascension of Christ in the village of Taxiarches (Sipsa), which was officially consecrated in 1939, and became the spiritual leader of the community of Drama. Like other contemporary elders and many saints throughout Christian history, Karslidis is said to have sometimes been seen levitating in prayer during the Divine Liturgy.

Karslidis' relics are kept in the Monastery of the Ascension of Christ, in Taxiarches (Sipsa), Drama, and he is one of few saints known to bear an imprint of the sign of the cross on his skull. He was glorified on Sunday November 2, 2008, during the visit to the city of Drama of Ecumenical Patriarch Bartholomew I, and his Feast Day is celebrated every year on November 4.

The Holy Synod of the Russian Orthodox Church decided at its meeting of December 24, 2008 to add Karslidis' name to the menology of the Russian Orthodox Church, establishing his feast day on October 24/November 6.

Life

In Georgia
George Karslidis was born in Chadik, Tsalka, Georgia in 1901. His parents Savvas and Sophia baptized him with the name Athanasios. However, while he was still an infant, his parents died on the same day, and he was raised by his grandmother, who raised him with piety.

From a very early age, Karslidis gave signs of his inclination towards God. While still a child, he prayed constantly, practiced fasting, and at the age of seven years he went on a pilgrimage to venerate Panagia Soumela, at the Soumela Monastery.

At the age of just nine years old Karslidis became a Novice monk at a monastery in Georgia, after travelling to Tiflis, Georgia, where a priest cared for him. Thus beginning his monastic life, he waited nearly ten years to be officially tonsured a monk, which took place in July 1919, at the age of eighteen. He was given the new name Symeon. Soon afterwards he was ordained a Hierodeacon.

During the days of the persecution of the church by the communists in Georgia, Karslidis and his fellow monks were arrested as "enemies of the state", suffering imprisonment, humiliation, executions, public shaming, and tortures. He was sentenced to death by firing squad, and was shot, but survived miraculously, as the three bullets which hit him only grazed him, and did little harm.

Karslidis was given the new name George. By this time he had acquired the reputation of being a God-bearing elder and so people flocked to him.

In Greece
In 1929, Karslidis settled in the village of Taxiarches (Sipsa), in Drama, Northern Greece, where he lived the remaining thirty years of his life.

In 1936 Karslidis managed to make a pilgrimage to the Holy Land, visiting the sites of Christ's life, and visiting various monasteries and hermitages.

In 1938 the Greek government made a permanent distribution of farmland, and Karslidis was given an acre of land, on which he managed to build the foundations of a humble monastery dedicated to Christ's Ascension. The monastery was officially consecrated in 1939.

Karslidis foresaw the coming of World War II as well as the Greek Civil War that would follow it. He was sentenced to death for the second time in his life in 1941 by Bulgarian forces, but after he prayed with calmness and asked them to proceed with their work, they abandoned him out of fear and ran away; thus once again he survived miraculously.

Karslidis died a few hours after midnight on November 4, 1959, and was buried behind the Katholikon of the Monastery of the Ascension.

Monastery of the Ascension 
After Karslidis' death, the monastery he had worked so hard to establish fell into disrepair until 1970, when Metropolitan Dionysios (Kyratsos) of Drama undertook its renovation. Since then the monastic life has been re-established, with a monastic sisterhood dedicated to Christ, and to the memory of the monastery's founder.

On April 25, 1971, the monastery was consecrated, and on November 5, 1976, it was granted official recognition by the Church of Greece.

Notes

Citations

Sources
 Middleton, Herman A. "Elder George of Drama." In: Precious Vessels of the Holy Spirit: The Lives and Counsels of Contemporary Elders of Greece. 2nd Edition. Thessalonica, Greece & Asheville, NC: Protecting Veil Press, 2004. pp. 178–191.  
 Moses, Monk of Mount Athos. The Blessed Elder George Karslides (1901–1959). Thessaloniki: Orthodox Kypseli Publications, 1998. 149 pp.
 October 22/November 4. Orthodox Calendar (PRAVOSLAVIE.RU).

In Greek
 Great Synaxaristes: Ὁ Ὅσιος Γεώργιος Καρσλίδης. 4 Νοεμβρίου. ΜΕΓΑΣ ΣΥΝΑΞΑΡΙΣΤΗΣ.
  Όσιος Γεώργιος Καρσλίδης ο Ομολογητής. Ορθόδοξος Συναξαριστής. 04/11/2014.
  Θαύματα, διδαχές και Προφητείες του οσίου πατρός Γεωργίου Καρσλίδη. Ιερά Μητρόπολις Δράμας. 07/11/2011. Retrieved: 30 July 2014.
  ΙΕΡΕΣ ΜΟΝΕΣ – 2) Αναλήψεως Του Σωτήρος. Ιερά Μητρόπολις Δράμας. 18/10/2011 . Retrieved: 30 July 2014.
  ΙΕΡΑ ΜΟΝΗ ΑΝΑΛΗΨΕΩΣ ΤΟΥ ΣΩΤΗΡΟΣ ΤΑΞΙΑΡΧΩΝ (ΣΙΨΑ) ΔΡΑΜΑΣ. Μοναστήρια της Ελλάδας. Retrieved: 30 July 2014.

1901 births
1959 deaths
20th-century Eastern Orthodox clergy
20th-century Christian saints
Clairvoyants
Greek Eastern Orthodox priests
Greek Christian monks
Eastern Orthodox monks
Saints of modern Greece
Saints from Anatolia
Georgian people of Greek descent
Miracle workers
20th-century Eastern Orthodox priests
Greek saints of the Eastern Orthodox Church
People from Kvemo Kartli